Bonifacio Calde Lacwasan, Jr. is a Filipino politician who is the governor of Mountain Province.

Background
Bonifacio Jr.'s father was Bonifacio Lacwasan Sr. who served as deputy governor of the now defunct sub-province of Bontoc and a provincial board member of Mountain Province.

Career
Lacwasan was elevated as Governor of Mountain Province following the death of Leonard Mayaen on March 31, 2016. As the vice governor at the time of Mayaen's death, Lacwasan was sworn in on April 5, 2016, after a period of mourning as per Igorot customs. He served Mayaen's unexpired term until June 30, 2016.

Lacwasan was supposed to seek a reeelection bid as vice governor for the 2016 elections. The deceased Mayaen, who ran as an independent candidate, was the sole candidate for governor for that election. Lawyer and daughter of Mayaen, Kathy Jyll Mayaen-Luis claimed to be rightful governor as a substitute for her father's candidacy. However her claim was disputed due to a rule that no substitution is allowed for an independent candidate. Lacwasan would be ordered by the Commission on Elections to serve as acting governor once again.

Lacwasan would ran for Mountain Province governor and win in the 2019 elections. He would secure a fresh mandate again in the 2022 elections. He ran under PDP-Laban.

References

Living people
Governors of Mountain Province